Bennie John Reiges (March 4, 1920 – October 22, 2020) was an American football player and coach. He served as the head football coach at Arizona State Teachers College at Flagstaff—now known as Northern Arizona University—in 1950, compiling a record of 2–7.  Reiges played college football as a quarterback at the University of California, Los Angeles (UCLA) during the 1946 and 1947 seasons. He was selected by the Los Angeles Rams in the 1947 NFL Draft. He died in October 2020 at the age of 100.

Head coaching record

References

1920 births
2020 deaths
American centenarians
American football quarterbacks
Georgetown Hoyas football players
Los Angeles Bulldogs players
Men centenarians
Northern Arizona Lumberjacks football coaches
UCLA Bruins football players
Coaches of American football from Massachusetts
Players of American football from Worcester, Massachusetts
Basketball coaches from Massachusetts